Hongshan Square Station is an interchange station of Line 2 and Line 4 of Wuhan Metro. It entered revenue service on December 28, 2012. It is located in Wuchang District.

Station layout

Gallery

Station

Entrance

Paired cross-platform transfer 

Hongshan Square station offers paired cross-platform interchange for passengers riding between 4 directions of the two lines. The configuration for the two stations is similar to that of Mong Kok and Prince Edward stations in Hong Kong's Mass Transit Railway.

Those who going to Wuhan railway station, can transfer at Hongshan Square Station by crossing the platform, and vice versa.

References

Wuhan Metro stations
Line 2, Wuhan Metro
Line 4, Wuhan Metro
Railway stations in China opened in 2012